Sanremo Casino, officially named  is a gambling and entertainment complex located in Sanremo, on the Italian Riviera.

History
The Casino's building was designed by French architect Eugène Ferret, opening 12 January 1905.

Seven different projects were submitted, resulting in the victory of Ferret, who adhered to the Art Nouveau movement, so much in vogue in France back then. Ferret was also to be the first manager of the proper gaming activities by an agreement signed on 5 November 1903.

From 1913 the Casino had its own tram connection.

In 1927, by means of normalizing a situation of tolerance that lasted for years and in order, among other things, to cope with competition from neighbouring Côte d'Azur; the RDL n. 2448 from 22 December 1927 "Ruling in favour of the City of Sanremo" was converted into Law n. 3125 of 27 December 1928;   allowing the City of Sanremo, quite exceptionally, to engage in gambling activities and also allowing an arrangement of the municipal budget so to facilitate the execution of major public works.

The Casino was first born as a Kursaal, and initially its building held theatre programmes, concerts and eateries as well as serving as a meeting place for foreigners. From 1927 to 1934 the Casino was managed by Luigi De Santis who proved to be, among other things, a first-rate gamester for its knowledge of the game and the particularities of the world around it.

In the 1930s, Pietro Mascagni, Luigi Pirandello and Francesco Pastonchi were regular clients of the Casino, along with other prestigious artists like Francesco Cilea, Sem Benelli, Umberto Giordano, Franco Alfano, Francesco Malipiero  the town. De Santis invited Marta Abba to Sanremo and offered her the Compagnia Stabile (Theatre Company) of which Pirandello was to be its Artistic Director. It also granted funds to Pastonchi for the organisation and setting up of the Literary Mondays.

On April 14, 1934 the company changed its name to Società Anonima Iniziative Turistiche (SAIT). In October of the same year, due to the death of Cavalier De Santis, the shares passed to his wife Maria Strambini who in the early months of 1935 sold them to Cavalier Angelo Belloni who took over the management.

The Casinò di Sanremo closed its doors on 10 June 1940. Still, undamaged by the war and two German and allied occupations; the Casino resumed its activities seven months after the end of World War Il. From 1951 until 1976, the Casinò di Sanremo had been home of the Festival della canzone italiana.

Many movies were shot in the casino, including Lucky Night (1941), At the Bar Sport (1983), Infelici e contenti (1992), and Fortunata (2017).

See also
 Richard Jarecki

References

External links 

Buildings and structures in Sanremo
Casinos in Italy
Art Nouveau architecture in Italy
1905 establishments in Italy